Oleksandra Oleksandrivna Stadnyuk (born 16 April 1980 in Cherkassy) is a Ukrainian athlete who competes in the long jump and triple jump.

She finished seventh in triple jump at the 2006 IAAF World Indoor Championships in Moscow. Her personal best jump is 14.09 metres, achieved in June 2005 in Florence.

Competition record

External links

1980 births
Living people
Ukrainian female triple jumpers
Ukrainian female long jumpers
Athletes (track and field) at the 2008 Summer Olympics
Olympic athletes of Ukraine
Competitors at the 2007 Summer Universiade
21st-century Ukrainian women